The 50 Cent Party, also known as the 50 Cent Army or , are Internet commentators who are paid by the authorities of the People's Republic of China to spread the propaganda of the governing Chinese Communist Party (CCP). It was created during the early phases of the Internet's rollout to the wider public in China.

The name is derived from the fact that such commentators are paid RMB¥0.50 for every post. These commentators create comments or articles on popular Chinese social media networks that are intended to derail discussions which are critical of the CCP, promoting narratives that serve the government's interests and insulting or spreading misinformation about political opponents of the Chinese government, both domestic and abroad.

Authors of a paper published in 2017 in the American Political Science Review estimate that the Chinese government fabricates 488 million social media posts per year. In contrast to common assumptions, the 50 Cent Party consists mostly of paid bureaucrats who respond to government directives and rarely defend their government from criticism or engage in direct arguments because "... the goal of this massive secretive operation is instead to distract the public and change the subject." Around 80 percent of the analysed posts involve pro-China cheerleading with inspirational slogans, and 13 percent involve general praise and suggestions on governmental policies. Despite the common allegation of the commentators getting paid for their posts, the paper suggested there was "no evidence" that they are paid anything for their posts, instead being required to do so as a part of their official party duties.

Research by professors at Harvard, Stanford, and UC San Diego indicated a "massive secretive operation" to fill China's Internet with propaganda, and has resulted in some 488 million posts written by fake social media accounts, representing about 0.6 percent of the 80 billion posts generated on Chinese social media. To maximize their influence, such pro-government comments are made largely during times of intense online debate, and when online protests have a possibility of transforming into real life actions. The colloquial term  has also been used by some English speakers outside of China as an insult against people with perceived pro-CCP bias.

History

In October 2004, the local CCP Propaganda Department of Changsha started hiring Internet commentators, in one of the earliest known uses of professional Internet commentators.

In March 2005, the Ministry of Education of the People's Republic of China enacted a systematic censorship of Chinese college bulletin board systems. The popular "Little Lily" BBS, run by Nanjing University, was forced to close. As a new system was prepared to be launched, school officials hired students as part-time web commentators, paid from the university's work-study funds, to search the forum for undesirable information and actively counter it with Party-friendly viewpoints. In the following months, party leaders from Jiangsu began hiring their own teams. By mid-2007, web commentator teams recruited by schools, and party organizations were common across China. Shanghai Normal University employed undergraduates to monitor for signs of dissent and post on university forums. These commentators not only operate within political discussions, but also in general discussions. Afterwards, some schools and local governments also started to build similar teams.

On 23 January 2007, Chinese leader Hu Jintao demanded a "reinforcement of ideological and public opinion front construction and positive publicity" at the 38th collective learning of Politburo. Large Chinese websites and local governments have been requested to publish the sayings of Hu, and select "comrades with good political quality" to form "teams of Internet commentators" by the CCP Central Committee and General Office of the State Council.

Negative reporting of local authorities has increased on the Internet since then. In one instance described on the China Digital Times, the Jiaozuo (Henan) City Public Security Bureau established a mechanism to analyse public opinion after criticism of the police handling of a traffic incident appeared on the Internet. The Bureau responded with 120 staff calling for the truth to be revealed in line with the public opinion, which gradually shifted and eventually supported the police position, denouncing the original poster. In the aftermath of the 2008 Guizhou riot, Internet forums were filled with posts critical of the local authorities; the China News Weekly later reported that "the major task of the propaganda group was to organize commentators to past [sic] posts on websites to guide online public opinions."

In 2010, the Shanghai Communist Youth League's official website published a summary, saying that there were more than 200 topics by Shanghai Municipal Authorities' Internet commentators posted at People's Daily, Xinhua News Agency, Eastday, Sina and Tianya after many incidents in 2009, including the Lotus Riverside incident, the forced installation of Green Dam Youth Escort software, the Putuo Urban Administrative incident, the control of H1N1, the Shanghai entrapment incident, the self-immolation of Pan Rong, etc. It was praised by the Shanghai Internet Publicity Office.

In December 2014, a Chinese blogger hacked into and published email archives for the Internet Propaganda Department of Zhanggong District in Ganzhou, including over 2,700 emails of 50 Cent Party Internet commentators. For instance, on 16 January 2014, Shi Wenqing, secretary of the Ganzhou branch of the CCP, held a televised "Internet exchange" in which he answered questions from a local news website forum; 50 Cent Party commentators were instructed to post seven discussion points, such as (translated) "I really admire Party Secretary Shi, what a capable and effective Party Secretary! I hope he can be the father of Ganzhou for years to come."

Range of operation
The Ministry of Culture of the People's Republic of China now holds regular training sessions, where participants are required to pass an exam after which they are issued a job certification. As of 2008, the total number of 50-cent operatives was estimated to be in the tens of thousands, and possibly as high as 280,000–300,000. Every large Chinese website is instructed by the Information Office to create a trained team of Internet commentators.

According to the Chinese Communists' opinions of the recruitment of university Work Committee (tentative), the university Internet commentators are mainly selected from cadres or student cadres at the local CCP Publicity Department of universities, Youth League, Office of Academic Affairs, Network Center, Admissions Employment Department, Political Theory Department, Teaching Department and other units.

The court of Qinghe District, Huai'an organized a team of 12 commentators. Gansu Province hired 650 commentators, sorted by their writing abilities. Suqian Municipal Publicity Department's first 26 commentators' team were reported by Yangtse Evening Post in April 2005. According to high-profile independent Chinese blogger Li Ming, the pro-Chinese government web commentators must number "at least in the tens of thousands".

A 2016 Harvard study estimated that the group posts about 488 million social media comments per year.

According to an article published by Xiao Qiang on his website China Digital Times, a leaked propaganda directive, sent to 50 Cent Party Internet commentators, stated their objective was the following:
In order to circumscribe the influence of Taiwanese democracy, in order to progress further in the work of guiding public opinion, and in accordance with the requirements established by higher authorities to "be strategic, be skilled," we hope that internet commentators conscientiously study the mindset of netizens, grasp international developments, and better perform the work of being an internet commentator. For this purpose, this notice is promulgated as set forth below:

(1) To the extent possible make America the target of criticism. Play down the existence of Taiwan.
(2) Do not directly confront [the idea of] democracy; rather, frame the argument in terms of "what kind of system can truly implement democracy.”
(3) To the extent possible, choose various examples in Western countries of violence and unreasonable circumstances to explain how democracy is not well-suited to capitalism.
(4) Use America's and other countries' interference in international affairs to explain how Western democracy is actually an invasion of other countries and [how the West] is forcibly pushing [on other countries] Western values.
(5) Use the bloody and tear-stained history of a [once] weak people [i.e., China] to stir up pro-Party and patriotic emotions.
(6) Increase the exposure that positive developments inside China receive; further accommodate the work of maintaining [social] stability.

Terms
There is an alternate official term for the Internet Commentator, as well as several unofficial terms coined by netizens for them:

Among those names, "50 Cent Party" was the most common and pejorative unofficial term.

The term is applied by Chinese netizens to any person who blatantly expresses pro-CCP thoughts online.

According to Foreign Policy, Chinese cyberspace is also noted for its ideological contests between "rightists" – reformists who advocate Western-style democratic reforms, versus "leftists" – conservatives and neo-Confucianists who advocate Chinese nationalism and restructured socialism. In this backdrop, rightists sometimes refer to leftists derogatorily as "50 Centers", regardless of their actual employment background.

The Hong Kong-based Apple Daily reported that although a search for "" ("50 Cent Party" in Chinese) on a search engine produces results, most were inaccessible and had been deleted.

Effects and opinions
The Internet commentator/50 Cent Party's activities were described by CCP general secretary and Chinese president Hu Jintao as "a new pattern of public-opinion guidance"; they represent a shift from simply erasing dissenting opinions to guiding dialogue. In 2010, a contributor to The Huffington Post stated that some comments she received on one of her posts were from the 50 Cent Party; she also stated that the 50 Cent Party monitors popular US websites, news sites and blogs and posts comments that advance Chinese governmental interests.

David Wertime of Foreign Policy argued that the narrative where a large army of paid Internet commentators are behind China's poor public dialogue with its critics is "Orwellian, yet strangely comforting". Rather, many of the Chinese netizens spreading nationalist sentiment online are not paid, but often mean what they say.

The colloquial term wumao, from the Chinese pronunciation of the term, has been used as an insult by some English speakers against people with perceived pro-CCP or pro-Chinese views, and has been cited in discussions of Sinophobia. An analyst at the Wilson Center has noted that ethnic Chinese are more likely to be called wumao than other groups of people in the English-speaking world; she attributed some of this to racism. In Australia, the term has been used as an insult amidst the rise of anti-Asian and anti-Chinese sentiments and the ongoing debate over increasing "Chinese influence" in the country.

Counter measures 
Facebook and Twitter have been removing accounts and pages that are of "coordinated state-backed operation". In June 2020, Twitter has removed 170,000 accounts which targeted 2019–20 Hong Kong protests.

See also

In China 
 Internet censorship in China
 Internet Water Army, private astroturfing from paid Chinese writers paralleling the 50 Cent Party
 Great Firewall, a Chinese system to censor and regulate the Internet
 Little Pink, Chinese nationalist netizens
 PLA Unit 61398, the hacking and malware implantation unit of the People's Liberation Army

Elsewhere 
 Astroturfing, a form of advocacy in support of a political, organizational, or corporate agenda, designed to give the appearance of a "grassroots" movement
 State-sponsored Internet sockpuppetry, a list of other similar programs internationally
 U.S. government edits of Wikipedia
 Operation Earnest Voice, U.S. government program aimed at spreading pro-U.S. propaganda on websites frequented in the Middle East
 Russian web brigades, Russian state-sponsored propaganda trolls
 Internet Research Agency, a Russian-owned company engaged in online influence operations
 AK Trolls, Turkish state-sponsored propaganda trolls
 Public opinion brigades, state-sponsored propaganda party working for the Communist Party of Vietnam
 Force 47, Vietnamese military unit that disseminates pro-regime propaganda and hacks anti-government websites
 NAFO, pro-Ukrainian social media group active mostly on Twitter

References

Further reading
  - PDF
  (Article PDF, supplementary appendix, and symposium info)

External links
 China Digital Times articles related to the 50 Cent Party

Chinese Internet slang
Disinformation operations
Internet censorship in China
Internet manipulation and propaganda
Internet trolling
Political slurs
Propaganda in China
Propaganda techniques
Public relations techniques